Jacopo Giuliani (born 9 January 1999) is an Italian football player. He plays for the Under-19 squad of Spezia.

Club career
He made his Serie C debut for Pontedera on 22 September 2018 in a game against Piacenza.

On 5 October 2020 his rights were sold to Carpi. He was not registered for Carpi and returned to the Under-19 squad of Spezia in January 2021.

References

External links
 

1999 births
People from La Spezia
Footballers from Liguria
Living people
Italian footballers
Association football midfielders
Spezia Calcio players
U.S. Città di Pontedera players
A.C. Carpi players
Serie C players
Sportspeople from the Province of La Spezia